was a Japanese politician of the Liberal Democratic Party and member of the House of Councillors in the Diet (national legislature), formerly Minister of State for Disaster Mnagement. A native of Amagasaki, Hyōgo and graduate of Waseda University, he was elected to the House of Representatives for the first time in 1986 after an unsuccessful run in 1983. After losing his seat in 1993, he was elected to the House of Councillors for the first time in 1995 and is currently serving his fourth 6-year term.

Biography 
In July 2003 Konoike caused controversy when he commented on an ongoing murder case, saying that the parents of the accused "should be paraded through the city and decapitated". He apologized for the comments but one week later he commented on a different case, in which four child sex slaves escaped from the house of a dead captor, saying "we don't know if the girls are victims or assailants", and added, "if you're arguing the girls were bought as slaves, you assume they have no responsibility". Konoike's comments were seen as problematic as he was serving as deputy head of a government department set up to address the issue of youth crime and unemployment at the time, which led Prime Minister Junichiro Koizumi to make a public statement that any further such comments would not be tolerated. In 2007, when asked to comment on an unrelated murder case, he said, that "they should be paraded through the ci... no, I'm not allowed to say that, am I?"

Konoike was removed from his post as deputy chief cabinet secretary on May 13, 2009, and was admitted to a mental hospital after the weekly magazine Shukan Shincho revealed that he had used his government shinkansen free pass to travel to Atami to spend several days with a mistress. He was also expelled from the Hyogo branch of the party, but was subsequently readmitted to the party on 30 August 2010.

Konoike was elected to the House of Councillors for his fourth consecutive term in the July 2013 election and unsuccessfully contested the ballot to replace Hirofumi Nakasone as the LDP's leader in the house. He lost the ballot to Kensei Mizote 82–31.

He died on 25 December 2018 at the age of 78.

Notes

References

External links 
  in Japanese.

Members of the House of Councillors (Japan)
1940 births
2018 deaths
People from Amagasaki
Liberal Democratic Party (Japan) politicians